Prince Heinrich Hartneid of Liechtenstein (Heinrich Hartneid Maria Franz de Paula Johann Aloys Joseph Ignatius Benedictus Hilarion; 1 October 1920 – 29 November 1993) was a Liechtensteiner prince and brother of Franz Joseph II. He was the eighth child and sixth son of Prince Aloys of Liechtenstein and Archduchess Elisabeth Amalie of Austria.

He married on 23 April 1968, in Vienna, Amalie Gräfin von Podstatzky-Lichtenstein (born 22 May 1935 in Olomouc).

They had three children:
 Princess Maria Elisabeth (b. 30 June 1969, in Bern), married civilly in Vaduz on 21 May 2004 and religiously in Blonay on 5 June 2004 Gilles Rouvinez (b. 25 May 1964, in Martigny), without issue
 Prince Hubertus Aloys (b. 24 May 1971, in Bern)
 Princess Marie Therese Eleonore (b. 29 January 1974, in Bern)

Prince Heinrich Hartneid died on 29 November 1993.

Ancestry

References

1920 births
1993 deaths
Princes of Liechtenstein
Ambassadors of Liechtenstein to Switzerland